Anxiety is an oil-on-canvas painting created by the expressionist artist Edvard Munch in 1894. It is now in the Munch Museum in Oslo, Norway. Many art critics feel that Anxiety is closely related to Munch’s more famous piece, The Scream (1893). The faces show despair and the dark colors show a depressed state. Many critics also believe it’s meant to show the emotions of heartbreak and sorrow.

References

Paintings by Edvard Munch
1894 paintings
Paintings in the collection of the Munch Museum
Ships in art
Bridges in art
Anxiety